Series 32 of University Challenge began on 2 September 2002, with the final on 31 March 2003.

It also marked the 40th anniversary of the show’s formation.

Results
 Winning teams are highlighted in bold.
 Teams with green scores (winners) returned in the next round, while those with red scores (losers) were eliminated.
 Teams with orange scores have lost, but survived as the first round losers with the highest losing scores.
 A score in italics indicates a match decided on a tie-breaker question.

First round

Highest Scoring Losers Playoffs

Second round

Quarter-finals

Semi-finals

Final

 The trophy and title were awarded to the Birkbeck team comprising Tony Walsh, Thor Halland, Tony Gillham and Colum Gallivan.
 The trophy was presented by Benjamin Zephaniah.

References

External links
 University Challenge Homepage
 Blanchflower Results Table

2002
2002 British television seasons
2003 British television seasons